Jones Motor Company is a historic U.S. Route 66-era building in Albuquerque, New Mexico. Built in 1939, on Central Avenue in the Nob Hill neighborhood of Albuquerque, the building originally housed Ralph Jones' service station and Ford Motor Company car dealership. It was designed by Tom Danahy in the Streamline Moderne style, with curved garage bays surmounted by a central stepped tower.

Jones Motor Company was added to the New Mexico State Register of Cultural Properties and the National Register of Historic Places in 1993, and was designated as a protected city landmark in 2001. In 2000 it was restored and converted into Kelly's Brew Pub after lying empty for many years. It also houses a Cold Stone Creamery location.

Notes

External links

Landmarks in Albuquerque, New Mexico
Commercial buildings in Albuquerque, New Mexico
Transportation buildings and structures on the National Register of Historic Places in New Mexico
Commercial buildings completed in 1939
Buildings and structures on U.S. Route 66
Retail buildings in New Mexico
Streamline Moderne architecture in New Mexico
U.S. Route 66 in New Mexico
New Mexico State Register of Cultural Properties
Auto dealerships on the National Register of Historic Places
Ford Motor Company
National Register of Historic Places in Albuquerque, New Mexico